Villa Ada is a park in Rome, Italy, with a surface of  it is the second largest in the city after Villa Doria Pamphili. It is located in the northeastern part of the city.

History

The wooded expanse was owned by the Italian royal House of Savoy in the latter half of the nineteenth century; it contained the royal residence (1872–1878).  In 1878 the area came under the control of Count Tellfner of Switzerland, who named it in honor of his wife Ada.  The royal family regained control of the land in 1904 but did not change the name. They retained control of the area until 1946.

Present status

As of 2009 the area contains both public and private areas.  The public area is controlled by the Council of Rome; the private area is controlled by the Egyptian Embassy, although the Town Council has made a formal claim to take control of the whole area.  The private portion is under constant patrol by police or army personnel.

Activities
The public portion of the park is much larger than the private area.  It contains an artificial lake and many trees, including stone pines, holm oaks, laurels and a very rare metasequoia, imported from Tibet in 1940.  Entrance to the park is free.  One may rent canoes, bicycles, or riding horses.  There is a large swimming pool.

Since 1994, during the summer the park hosts the world-music festival and the "Roma incontra il mondo" (Rome meets the World) festival, against racism, war and the death penalty.

The "Bunker Villa Ada Savoia," a bunker built in the early 1940s by the House of Savoy to protect the King and Queen (King Victor Emmanuel III of Italy and Queen Elena) from Allied bombs, is now open for tours. The non-profit association, Roma Sotteranea, restored the bunker, which had fallen to ruin and had been vandalized, and runs the tours for a small cost.  To date, all tours have been in Italian.

Also, Benito Mussolini was taken captive by King Victor Emmanuel III during World War II from that house.

See also
List of parks and gardens in Rome
Villa Doria Pamphili

References

External links

Gardens in Rome
Rome Q. II Parioli
Royal residences in Italy